The College Sailing Women's Team Racing National Championship is one of the seven Inter-Collegiate Sailing Association National Championships. It was established in 2022 to show the commitment of the ICSA to women's sailing.

Champions

Championships by team

References

External links 
WOMEN’S TEAM RACE CHAMPIONSHIPS

ICSA championships
Women's sailing competitions